Ol-molog is an administrative ward in the Monduli district of the Arusha Region of Tanzania with postcode 23505. According to the 2002 census, the ward has a total population of 12,209.

References

Monduli District
Wards of Arusha Region